Bjorn Rebney is an American businessman who served as chairman and chief executive officer of Bellator MMA from 2008 until June 2014.

Background
Rebney attended Ohio University on a football scholarship and then attended law school. Rebney did legal work in construction-defect then moved to the sports-law firm Steinberg Moorad & Dunn. In 2001, Rebney formed a partnership with Sugar Ray Leonard. The company was Sugar Ray Leonard Boxing Inc. The two had a falling out and the business dissolved. 

Rebney is Jewish.

Bellator MMA
Rebney's passion was for Mixed Martial Arts, which made him decide to start a MMA promotion. In his search for investors to fund his idea of a promotion, Rebney had sixty-one investor meetings within 16 months. To fund these trips to meet with investors and fighters, Rebney spent his savings and took out a second and third mortgage on his home.  In Rebney's 62nd meeting with investors, he met executives at Plainfield Asset Management, who were familiar with the sport from prior meetings with management of EliteXC and the International Fight League who looked for capital to stay in business. Among the investors were Tim Danaher, who was the company's vice president at the time. After a follow-up meeting in New York, Plainfield agreed to provide the capital, which led to the creation of Bellator Fighting Championships.

In October 2011, television and media conglomerate Viacom (now ViacomCBS) purchased majority ownership of Bellator. Despite the company no longer being under Rebney's ownership, he remained Chairman and CEO of the company until June 18, 2014, when it was announced by Viacom that Rebney had been removed from his position and would no longer have anything to do with Bellator. 
In addition to Rebney, Tim Danaher lost his positions as president and COO. He was replaced by former Strikeforce president and CEO Scott Coker.
Bjorn Rebney's former boss, Kevin Kay, later explained the reason for Rebney's separation from the company. Rebney was committed to keeping Bellator a tournament-based promotion, while Kay felt it would have limited the growth of the organization.

MMAAA
In November 2016, it was announced that Rebney was chosen as an advisor to the Mixed Martial Arts Athletes Association (MMAAA).
Among the members of the former organization were Georges St.Pierre, Cain Velasquez, T.J. Dillashaw, Tim Kennedy and Donald Cerrone.

Personal life 

Rebney's father is Jack Rebney, an unintended viral video star, and later subject of the documentary Winnebago Man (2009).

Rebney is married to Huma Gruaz, an advertising and public relations executive. The couple have two children, Jonathan and Celine.

References 

Mixed martial arts executives
Year of birth missing (living people)
Living people
Ohio University alumni
American Jews